The Genius Brothers Building, in Kinder, Louisiana, was built in 1916 and was listed on the National Register of Historic Places in 1990.

It is located at the corner of 8th St. and 4th Ave. in Kinder.

Architecture: Vernacular Commercial

It "is a single story brick commercial vernacular structure located on Eighth Street in the small town of Kinder. There
have been some alterations over the years, but the building's architectural
identity survives well intact. / Laid up in common bond brick, the building features two shopfronts, one of
which has a corner entrance. Originally, it contained two separate stores. The original metal fixed awning is surmounted by a transom level (windows covered over) and a paneled parapet. The parapet top culminates in a central pediment
shape and is surmounted by three concrete pineapple finials. The shopfronts
retain their original shape and configuration, although the glass and kickplates
are replacements. An interesting feature of the shopfront level is that the
piers are coated with concrete which is lightly scored to resemble cut stone.
The rear and north side of the building feature segmentally arched openings, most
of which have been bricked in, although the outlines are clearly visible. The
south side of the building is a party wall which formerly divided it from an
adjacent commercial building. This adjacent building was recently demolished.
To prevent moisture penetration at the top of the former party wall, the present
owner applied a strip of standing seam metal sheathing (about 3 feet in height).
The interior is modern looking, with plywood paneling and a lowered
acoustical tile ceiling. The original pressed metal ceiling is still in place
above the acoustical tiles. In addition, the old beaded board walls appear to be
still intact beneath the plywood paneling. The only other noteworthy interior
alteration has been the removal of the brick wall which previously divided the
two shops."

References

LA
National Register of Historic Places in Allen Parish, Louisiana
Buildings and structures completed in 1916